The 2022–23 season is the 125th season in the existence of Fulham Football Club. It will be the club's first campaign back in the Premier League since 2020–21 following their promotion from the previous season. In addition to the league, they also competed in the FA Cup and the EFL Cup.

Transfers

In

Out

Loans in

Loans out

Pre-season and friendlies
On May 27, Fulham announced they would visit Portugal as part of pre-season preparations and participate in a mini-tournament at the Estádio Algarve on 16 and 17 July 2022. During the club's stay in Algarve they would compete in the Algarve Trophy tournament against Nice and Benfica. A third friendly match whilst in Portugal was confirmed against Estoril Praia. The final pre-season game of the schedule was scheduled to be at home against Villarreal.

During the 2022 FIFA World Cup winter break, Fulham confirmed a friendly against West Ham United.

Competitions

Overall record

Premier League

League table

Results summary

Results by round

Matches

On 16 June, the Premier League fixtures were released.

FA Cup

The club entered in the third round and were drawn away to Hull City. In the fourth round they were drawn at home to Sunderland.

EFL Cup

Fulham entered the EFL Cup in the second round and were drawn away to Crawley Town.

Squad statistics

Appearances and goals
Players listed with no appearances have been in the matchday squad but only as unused substitutes.

|-
! colspan=14 style=background:#dcdcdc; text-align:center| Goalkeepers

|-
! colspan=14 style=background:#dcdcdc; text-align:center| Defenders

|-
! colspan=14 style=background:#dcdcdc; text-align:center| Midfielders

|-
! colspan=14 style=background:#dcdcdc; text-align:center| Forwards

|-
! colspan=14 style=background:#dcdcdc; text-align:center|Out on Loan

|-
! colspan=14 style=background:#dcdcdc; text-align:center|Left the Club during the Season

|-

Top scorers
Includes all competitive matches. The list is sorted by squad number when total goals are equal.

Last updated 28 February 2023

Notes

References

External links

Fulham F.C. seasons
Fulham
Fulham
Fulham
English football clubs 2022–23 season